Henry Joseph Macaulay Barnett  (February 10, 1922 – October 20, 2016) was a Canadian physician, a leading stroke researcher and pioneer of the use of aspirin for stroke prevention.

Born in Newcastle upon Tyne, England, he graduated from the University of Toronto Schools and received his medical degree from the University of Toronto in 1944.

He started to work at the University Hospital in London, Ontario and the University of Western Ontario in 1974.

From its founding in 1986, he was the president and scientific director of Robarts Research Institute until his retirement in 1995.

In 1984 he was made an Officer of the Order of Canada and was promoted to Companion in 2003. In 1995 he was inducted into the Canadian Medical Hall of Fame. In 2001 he was awarded an honorary Doctor of Laws degree from the University of Western Ontario, and in 2012 he was awarded an honorary Doctor of Science degree from the University of Oxford.

The Heart and Stroke Foundation of Canada's Henry JM Barnett Research Scholarship Award is named in his honour. He died in Toronto on October 20, 2016.

References

 

  
 
 
 

1922 births
2016 deaths
Canadian medical researchers
Canadian cardiologists
Companions of the Order of Canada
British emigrants to Canada
People from Newcastle upon Tyne
University of Toronto alumni
Foreign Members of the Russian Academy of Sciences